The 2015 ITF Women's Circuit – Xuzhou was a professional tennis tournament played on outdoor hard courts. It was the first edition of the tournament and part of the 2015 ITF Women's Circuit, offering a total of $50,000 in prize money. It took place in Xuzhou, China, on 25–31 May 2015.

Singles main draw entrants

Seeds 

 1 Rankings as of 18 May 2015

Other entrants 
The following players received wildcards into the singles main draw:
  Cao Siqi
  Li Yixuan
  Zhu Aiwen

The following players received entry from the qualifying draw:
  Gai Ao
  Kang Jiaqi
  Yang Shangqing
  Zhao Qianqian

The following players received a lucky loser spot into the main draw:
  Chen Jiahui
  Zhou Mingjun

Champions

Singles

 Luksika Kumkhum def.  Chang Kai-chen, 1–6, 7–5, 6–1

Doubles

 Chang Kai-chen /  Han Xinyun def.  Cao Siqi /  Zhou Mingjun, 6–3, 6–2

External links 
 2015 ITF Women's Circuit – Xuzhou at ITFtennis.com

2015 ITF Women's Circuit
2015
2015
2015 in Chinese tennis